The  or SSJ is a learned society (professional association) with the goal of advancing the understanding of earthquakes and other seismic phenomena.

History
John Milne joined James Alfred Ewing, Thomas Lomar Gray and Thomas Corwin Mendenhall in founding the Seismological Society in 1880.  These men were teaching at the Imperial College of Tokyo (now called the University of Tokyo) and were foreign advisors to the government in Meiji period Japan (o-yatoi gaikokujin).

The founding president of the society was Hattori Ichizo.

Publications 
The organization publishes the  abbreviated at "J Seismol Soc Jpn".  The publication is also known as Zisin, which is a syllabic abbreviation.
The SSJ also sponsors the journal Earth, Planets and Space.

Notes

References
 Clancey, Gregory. (2006). Earthquake Nation: The Cultural Politics of Japanese Seismicity, 1868–1930. Berkeley: University of California Press. ;  OCLC 219039402
 Davison, Charles. (2014). The Founders of Seismology. Cambridge University Press. ; 
 Robinson, Andrew. (2016). Earth-Shattering Events: Earthquakes, Nations and Civilizations. Thames & Hudson. ;

External links
SSJ

Scientific organizations established in 1880
Geology societies
Science and technology in Japan
Geophysics societies
1880 establishments in Japan
Scientific organizations based in Japan